The Real World: California (retrospectively referred to as The Real World: Los Angeles, to distinguish it from subsequent installments of the series) is the second season of MTV's reality television series The Real World, which focuses on a group of diverse strangers living together for several months, as the cameras follow their lives and interpersonal relationships. It is the first season of The Real World to be filmed in the Pacific States region of the United States, specifically in California.

The season featured a total of nine cast members over the course of the season, as one cast member was evicted and replaced, and another was replaced when she got married. The Real World expanded from 13 to 21 episodes with this season. Production for the season was from February to June 1993. This is the first of two seasons to be filmed in Los Angeles. In 2008, filming of the twentieth season again took place in Los Angeles, this time in the district of Hollywood.

The season, which documented 22 weeks of the cast's interactions, began with two cast members being flown to Nashville and then spending ten days driving cross country to their Venice Beach house in a Winnebago, picking up a third cast member in Owensboro, Kentucky along the way.

Season changes
When this season first aired in 1993, the original title for this season was The Real World: California. Years later, the season's title was retroactively changed to The Real World: Los Angeles, mainly to avoid confusion with later seasons filmed in California (San Francisco, San Diego, and Hollywood). The show also expanded from 13 half-hour episodes to 21.

This season was the only one in which two housemates, Tami and Dominic, picked up a third housemate, Jon, at his home in a state other than the one in which the show would be set, and traveled to their new home in a Winnebago RV. Journeying in a Winnebago would later become a regular motif on the spinoff show, Road Rules. This was the first season in which cast members left the show during filming: David Edwards, who was asked to leave by his housemates, and Irene Berrera-Kearns, because she got married. Consequently, it was the first season to feature a season total of more than seven cast members, as two additional castmates, Glen Naessens and Beth Anthony, moved in to replace Edwards and Berrera-Kearns. In what would become the norm for The Real World, the entire cast was sent on a trip abroad, whereas in the previous season, only the women were.

The house in which the cast lived now featured a small sound proof room for the weekly "confessional" cast interviews, and became known itself by that name.

Residence

The $2 million (1993 dollars), three-story, four bedroom, four bathroom house is located at 30 30th Avenue in Venice Beach, one block east of the beach. According to the owner, after the filming of the series was complete, the interior and exterior of the house were repainted back to their original pink color. The only room not to be repainted was the room that was renovated into the Confessional room, which was painted blue with white clouds for the filming of the series. When the current owners purchased the house in 1996, the house was painted light blue/gray with a white trim and the interior pink carpeting was changed to gray. A sign outside the house read:"This area is being used by Bunim-Murray Productions for taping of a television program. By your entrance into this area and your presence, you give unqualified consent to Bunim-Murray to record, use and publicize your voice, actions, likeness and appearance in any manner in connection with the program. If you do not wish to be taped as part of the program, please exit the area until all taping has been completed."

Cast

: Age at the time of filming.

Duration of cast 

Notes

Episodes

In popular culture
The show was satirized in the October 2, 1993 episode of the sketch comedy show, Saturday Night Live. The episode, which was hosted by Shannen Doherty, featured a skit depicting a Real World cast patterned after the Los Angeles cast, and poked fun at the discussions of racism, bigotry and political differences that served as a recurring theme that season.

The incident that led to David's eviction was parodied in a 1993 episode of the sketch comedy show, The Jon Stewart Show, with Jon Stewart portraying Tami in the skit.

A skit called The Mad Real World: Hoboken that appeared in a Season 1 episode of Chappelle's Show parodied The Real World franchise but is particularly aimed at the events of The Real World: Los Angeles. During the DVD commentary Dave Chappelle notes that he is a friend of David Edwards, and helped to get him on the cast of The Real World. He notes that much of the impetus for the Chappelle Show skit was his perception that the casts of The Real World often display their racist perceptions of African Americans, especially black men, as typified by the incident with Edwards.

After filming
At the 2008 The Real World Awards Bash, David and Tami received a nomination for "Best Fight", David also received one in the "Gone Baby Gone" category, while Beth was in the running for the "Roommate You Love to Hate" award.

Beth Stolarczyk appeared nude in the May 2002 issue of Playboy magazine, along with other alumni of The Real World and Road Rules: Flora Alekseyeun, Veronica Portillo and Jisela Delgado. She produced, directed and starred in videos such as Reality TV's Sexiest Vixens, and the similarly-themed swimsuit calendars. She founded Planet Beth, an agency for reality TV stars. In 2008, she married Matt Ciriello and together they have two children: Julia and Nicholas.<ref name="generation">{{cite web|title='REAL WORLDS NEXT GENERATION: SEE THE FORMER CAST MEMBERS' CAMERA-READY KIDS|url=http://www.mtv.com/news/2065104/real-world-castmembers-kids/|author=Jordana Ossad|website=MTV|date=February 2, 2015|access-date=May 13, 2019}}</ref>

Dominic Griffin continued his work in the entertainment industry, working as a senior editor at Film Threat magazine, a critic for Variety, and a radio show producer. He also founded a company that helps place music in movies, TV shows and video games. As of 2008, he is a music executive for Disney's TV and film projects.

Jon Brennan returned to his hometown, where as of 2008, he works as a church youth pastor, and performs as a singer/musician. As of 2021, he is still a virgin. 

As of 2008, Irene Barrera-Kearns is still a deputy with the L.A. County Sheriff's Department, and a mother of two.

Tami Akbar worked as a model, financial executive and actress, appearing in various TV shows and movies. She married basketball player Kenny Anderson. They have two daughters, Lyric and Jazz, but they later divorced. Under the name Tami Roman, she appeared as a cast member on the VH1 reality television series Basketball Wives, which depicted her and her husband's attempt to salvage their relationship. She also appeared on the Basketball Wives spinoff, Basketball Wives LA.Basketball Wives: Season 3: Cast: Tami Roman. VH1. Retrieved December 9, 2011.

In 2021, seven of the original nine cast members (excluding Aaron Behle and Dominic Griffin) reunited for The Real World Homecoming: Los Angeles.

The Challenge

Bold indicates the contestant was a finalist on The Challenge.

Note: David Edwards served as a host on the second season of The Challenge''.

References

External links
MTV's The Real World: Los Angeles Official Site
"The Real World: Los Angeles: Full Episode Synopses and Recaps". MTV.
"The Real World: Meet the Cast". MTV.
The Real World: Los Angeles Beach House Real World Houses.
The Real World and Road Rules Blog

Los Angeles
Real World, The
1993 American television seasons
Television shows filmed in Los Angeles